Sofia Iordanidou (born ) was a Greek female volleyball player. She was part of the Greece women's national volleyball team.

She competed with the national team at the 2004 Summer Olympics in Athens, Greece. 
She played with OFA Apollonios in 2004.

Clubs
  OFA Apollonios (2004)

See also
 Greece at the 2004 Summer Olympics

References

External links

1974 births
Living people
Greek women's volleyball players
Place of birth missing (living people)
Volleyball players at the 2004 Summer Olympics
Olympic volleyball players of Greece
Panathinaikos Women's Volleyball players
21st-century Greek women